Nushki (Urdu |) is a town and district in Balochistan, Pakistan. From Nushki, the flat Balochistan desert stretches away northward and westward to the Helmand River.

History
Nushki was a starting off point for the British exploration of Central Asia.  The British, concerned that their colonies in India would be attacked overland by either Napoleon or the Russians, sent two British officers, Captain Charles Christie and Lieutenant Henry Pottinger, to explore the regions between Balochistan and Persia, which was then allied with the British.  Christie and Pottinger traveled from the coast to Kelat (now Kalat) and separated at Nushki on March 22, 1810, with Christie going northwest to Herat and Pottinger traveling west across the deserts.  It was unlikely that either of the two men would be accepted by the locals, and they concealed their identities by posing as horse-traders or holy men during their respective journeys.  They were reunited in Isfahan on June 30, 1810, with Christie haven ridden 2,250 miles and Pottinger having ridden 2,412 miles.

See also
 Nushki District

References 

Populated places in Balochistan, Pakistan
Nushki District
Deserts of Pakistan